The Edward D. Kingsley House is a house located in southwest Portland, Oregon listed on the National Register of Historic Places.

See also
 National Register of Historic Places listings in Southwest Portland, Oregon

References

Houses on the National Register of Historic Places in Portland, Oregon
Colonial Revival architecture in Oregon
Houses completed in 1927
1927 establishments in Oregon
Portland Historic Landmarks
Southwest Hills, Portland, Oregon